Cryobacterium flavum is a Gram-positive and rod-shaped bacterium from the genus Cryobacterium which has been isolated from glacier ice from Xinjiang in China.

References

Microbacteriaceae
Bacteria described in 2012